Biography work is essentially about interest in the human being and the great mystery of existence we call human life.  It is an active practice for developing self-knowledge.  It is a search for meaning out of which may arise greater social understanding—deeper, genuine interest in one's fellow man.  Biography work is founded upon the vast work of Rudolf Steiner, collectively called spiritual science or anthroposophy--"wisdom or knowledge of the human being."  Anthroposophy is often described as a path from the spiritual in the human being to the spiritual in the world or cosmos.  A profound relationship exists between the cosmos or macrocosm and the human being as microcosm.  Indeed, anthroposophy suggests the human being is a microcosm of the macrocosm.  Yet, biography work works directly with physical existence, life on earth, which itself speaks volumes, if we will but "learn to read the text" of the individual experience, as well as that of the archetype.  The human being is a bridge then:  on the one hand, embedded in the earth, directed by the rhythms of nature, the seasons, night and day, etc.; and, on the other hand, belonging to the spiritual world.  "The only real hope of people today is probably a renewal of certainty that we are rooted in the earth, and at the same time in the cosmos," as so beautifully described by Vaclav Havel (The Measure of Man).

Individuality and Connection to Others 

Human life, one's biography, is shaped by the inherently creative and uniquely individual power of the "I" or Higher Ego or Higher Self.  It is an exploration of the role of the "I" in unfolding a life full of gifts, opportunities, illnesses, accidents, struggles, tasks, responsibilities, and perhaps above all questions. Biography work invites new self-understanding and, in turn, awakens interest in the experiences of others.  In an evermore virtual world, biography work fosters real meetings and genuine appreciation for the diversity of human endeavor and creativity.

History 
Biography Work was first developed in the 1970s, arising out of a picture of human development given by Rudolf Steiner early in the twentieth century.  Steiner described physical, soul, and spiritual development from birth to death in great detail, and included, as a significant aspect of the whole human being, the soul’s further spiritual growth after death and through successive lifetimes, i.e. reincarnation.  Steiner knew that in our time there would be tremendous need for increased social understanding, and that the study of human development would be an essential foundation of such understanding.

One of the earliest descriptions of biography work given by Rudolf Steiner appears in the lecture titled "How Can the Destitution of the Soul in Modern Times Be Overcome?" and is as follows:  "As many descriptions as possible of how human beings really develop—what I would call the positive natural history of individual human development—must be disseminated in an understanding way.  Wherever we can we should describe how this or that person developed—we should be able to give a loving account of human development, as we have observed it. The study of life is needed, the will to the understanding of life."

Drawing on the many references found in multiple lectures given by Rudolf Steiner, students of his work and leaders in the anthroposophical community began creating practices that today are collectively referred to as "biography work" (or sometimes "social art").  Two of those leaders, Bernard Lievegoed, a Dutch physician, and Gudrun Burkhard, a physician who still lives and practices in Brazil, both teachers and authors as well, led a pioneering initiative and introduced this new way of life-consultation, first in their respective regions and soon to the world.  In the United States, the efforts of George and Gisela O'Neil culminated in the publication (by Florin Lowndes, after the O'Neils' deaths) of The Human Life, a rich depiction of human development, birth to death, a thorough exploration of their original work in developing the life-chart, and a comprehensive collection of references made by Dr. Steiner regarding human biography.

Method or Ways of Working 
Biography work is about listening. At the heart of biography work is the understanding that each life story is a unique revelation of intention and deep wisdom. For the biography practitioner, each “journey” is sacred, and there is an understanding that the “traveler” is continually informed by both individual and universal truths. Biography practitioners bring a broad perspective, artistic exercises, and true listening to life explorations.
Biography work is phenomenological; its methods based in phenomenology, particularly as developed by Johann Wolfgang von Goethe.  Biography practitioners (also called biography workers, social artists) work via the following: workshops, adult education courses, one-on-one or small group conversation, counseling, consultation and continuing education for professionals.

Workshops and Courses 

These are offered on a variety of themes and the learning process is typically infused with social art.  Sessions might include short talks, biography exercises, work with storytelling, nature observation, artwork, meditation or inner practice, and conversation.  One of the gifts of working in groups is a heightened appreciation for each unique life as it resonates within the context of universal patterns.

Conversation 

Being one of the most human of activities, conversation is central to biography work.

Counseling 

Some certified biography practitioners are also licensed in counseling, psychotherapy, social work and the like. They typically work in a formal or clinical setting and are able to address crises, life-changing events, inner difficulties, and illness.

Consultation and Continuing Education 
 
Biography practitioners can bring new perspectives to existing professions such as art therapy, medicine, care for the elderly, hospice, work with the homeless, and more.

Literature 

 Bryant, W. (1993). The Veiled Pulse of Time: Life Cycles and Destiny.  Hudson, NY: Lindisfarne Press.
 Burkhard, G. (1992). Taking Charge: Your Life Patterns and Their Meaning.  Edinburgh, UK: Floris Book.
 Burkhard, G. (2002).  Biographical Work.  Edinburgh, UK: Floris Books.
 Lievegoed, B. (1983).  Man on the Threshold.  Stroud, UK: Hawthorn Press. 
 Lievegoed, B. (1979). Phases: The Spiritual Rhythms of Adult Life.  London, UK: Rudolf Steiner Press.
 O'Neil, G. & G. (1990). The Human Life.  Spring Valley, NY: Mercury Press.
 Schaefer, S.E.  (2013).  Why On Earth?  Biography and the Practice of Becoming.  Great Barrington, MA: Steiner Books.
 Schottelndreier, J. (1990).  Life Patterns.  Stroud, UK: Hawthorn Press.
 Staley, B. (1997).  Tapestries: Weaving Life's Journey.  Stroud, UK: Hawthorn Press.
 Bankim Chandra (2011). Anand Math. Manoj Publications, India
 Steiner, R.  (2009).  Biography, Freedom and Destiny: Enlightening the Path of Human Life.  Forest Row, UK: Rudolf Steiner Press. 
 Steiner, R.  (1972).  Karmic Relationships, Vol. I-VIII.  Forest Row, UK: Rudolf Steiner Press.
 Steiner, R. (1995).  Manifestations of Karma.  Forest Row, UK: Rudolf Steiner Press.
 Treichler, R. (1989).  Soul Ways.  Stroud, UK: Hawthorn Press

References
Mahatma Gandhi 2021. ''My Experiments with Truth, India.

External links 
  International Trainers Forum for Biography Work based on Anthroposophy.
  Biennial Worldwide Biography Conference.
   Center for Biography and Social Art  http://www.biographysocialart.org
   Professional Training in Applied Biographical Development  http://www.christophori.com
   Biography work; biographical counseling; consultation  http://biographyworker.com
   Living-way... Holistic Biography Work http://www.holisticbiographywork.com
   Professional Association of Biographical Counsellors (PABC). https://www.biographicalcounsellors.org.uk/

Anthroposophy
Counseling